The USCGC Harriet Lane (WSC-141) was a 125-foot patrol boat, commonly known as a "buck-and-a-quarter", 1926–1946.

She was the second ship named for Harriet Lane. She was based in Boston, Provincetown and Gloucester, Massachusetts. In 1941, the cutter served in World War II, and after for the Fifth Coast Guard District, home ported in Norfolk, Virginia. She was decommissioned in 1946, and became the merchant vessel Humble AC-4 in 1949.

References

Bibliography

"USCGC Harriet Lane (WMEC 903)". United States Coast Guard. Retrieved 5 July 2014.

1926 ships
Active-class patrol boats
Ships built in Camden, New Jersey